Talison Ruan da Silva (born 2 June 2000) is a Brazilian professional footballer who plays as a right-back for Alverca.

Career
Talison joined the youth academy of Atlético Mineiro in 2016, on loan from PSTC. He received an emergency call up to the first-team squad ahead of a Série A match against Athletico Paranaense on 18 November 2020, after several players of the team had tested positive for COVID-19. He started in the match, as Atlético suffered a 2–0 home defeat.

On 9 February 2021, Talison signed for Atlético on a permanent basis, agreeing to a three-year deal. On 23 May 2021, he joined Série B club Londrina on a six-month loan.

On 26 August 2021, Talison joined Portuguese club Alverca on a season-long loan. In July 2022, he signed a permanent deal.

Career statistics

Honours
Atlético Mineiro
Campeonato Mineiro: 2021
Campeonato Brasileiro Sub-20: 2020

References

External links
 

2000 births
Living people
Sportspeople from Tocantins
Brazilian footballers
Association football fullbacks
Campeonato Brasileiro Série A players
Campeonato Brasileiro Série B players
Clube Atlético Mineiro players
Londrina Esporte Clube players
F.C. Alverca players
Brazilian expatriate footballers
Brazilian expatriate sportspeople in Portugal
Expatriate footballers in Portugal